Lewis Gaylord Clark (October 5, 1808 – November 3, 1873) was an American magazine editor and publisher.

Biography
Clark was born in Otisco, New York in 1808. He had a twin brother, poet Willis Gaylord Clark.

Career
He succeeded Charles Fenno Hoffman as editor and publisher of The Knickerbocker magazine, a role he held for over 25 years (1834–1861). By 1840, it had become the most influential literary publication of the time in the United States, especially through the contributions from such writers as Washington Irving, William Cullen Bryant, Nathaniel Parker Willis, and Henry Wadsworth Longfellow, and by Clark's own departments, the "Editors Table" and "Gossip with Readers and Correspondents". Pecuniary distress caused its discontinuance, and Clark removed to Piermont, New York, where he lived in a residence presented by former contributors to his magazine, who raised the necessary funds in part by publishing a volume of their contributions, under the title The Knickerbocker Gallery. He published the Knickerbocker Sketch-Book (1850), including some of his own essays, and Knick-Knacks from an Editor's Table (1852). In retirement, after the magazine folded, Clark regularly contributed articles to the Evening Post and the Home Journal.

During his career, Clark made an enemy of fellow editor and author Edgar Allan Poe. The two traded insults in their respective magazines.

References

External links
 
 

American magazine editors
Writers from New York (state)
1808 births
1873 deaths
People from Otisco, New York
People from Piermont, New York
19th-century American journalists
American male journalists
19th-century American male writers
Journalists from New York City
Knickerbocker Group